Kadabi is a village in Yaragatti TalukaBelgaum district in the northern state of Karnataka, India.

References

Villages in Belagavi district